Thomas Cole was an English-born American artist and the founder of the Hudson River School art movement. Cole is widely regarded as the first significant American landscape painter. He was known for his romantic landscape and history paintings. Influenced by European painters, but with a strong American sensibility, he was prolific throughout his career and worked primarily with oil on canvas. His paintings are typically allegoric and often depict small figures or structures set against moody and evocative natural landscapes. They are usually escapist, framing the New World as a natural eden contrasting with the smog-filled cityscapes of Industrial Revolution-era Britain, in which he grew up. His works, often seen as conservative, criticize the contemporary trends of industrialism, urbanism, and westward expansion.

Early life and education 
Born in Bolton le Moors, Lancashire, in 1801, Cole immigrated with his family to the United States in 1818, settling in Steubenville, Ohio. At the age of 22, he moved to Philadelphia and later, in 1825, to Catskill, New York, where he lived with his wife and children until his death in 1848.

Cole found work early on as an engraver. He was largely self-taught as a painter, relying on books and by studying the work of other artists. In 1822, he started working as a portrait painter and later on, gradually shifted his focus to landscape.

Painting 

In New York, Cole sold three paintings to George W. Bruen, who subsequently financed a summer trip to the Hudson Valley where the artist produced landscapes featuring the Catskill Mountain House, the famous Kaaterskill Falls, the ruins of Fort Putnam, and two views of Cold Spring.  Returning to New York, he displayed five landscapes in the window of William Colman's bookstore; according to the New York Evening Post the two views of Cold Spring were purchased by Mr. A. Seton, who lent them to the American Academy of the Fine Arts annual exhibition in 1826. This garnered Cole the attention of John Trumbull, Asher B. Durand, and William Dunlap. Among the paintings was a landscape called View of Fort Ticonderoga from Gelyna. Trumbull was especially impressed with the work of the young artist and sought him out, bought one of his paintings, and put him into contact with a number of his wealthy friends including Robert Gilmor of Baltimore and Daniel Wadsworth of Hartford, who became important patrons of the artist.

Cole was primarily a painter of landscapes, but he also painted allegorical works. The most famous of these are the five-part series, The Course of Empire, which depict the same landscape over generations—from a near state of nature to consummation of empire, and then decline and desolation—now in the collection of the New-York Historical Society and the four-part The Voyage of Life. There are two versions of the latter, the 1840 original at the Munson-Williams-Proctor Arts Institute in Utica, New York and the 1842 replicas with minor alterations at the National Gallery in Washington, D.C. Among Cole's other famous works are The Oxbow (1836), The Notch of the White Mountains, Daniel Boone at his cabin at the Great Osage Lake, and Lake with Dead Trees (1825) which is at the Allen Memorial Art Museum. He also painted The Garden of Eden (1828), with lavish detail of Adam and Eve living amid waterfalls, vivid plants, and deer. In 2014, friezes painted by Cole on the walls of his home, which had been decorated over, were discovered.

Cole influenced his peers in the art movement later termed the Hudson River School, especially Asher B. Durand and Frederic Edwin Church. Church studied with Cole from 1844 to 1846, where he learned Cole's technique of sketching from nature and later developing an idealized, finished composition; Cole's influence is particularly notable in Church's early paintings. Cole spent the years 1829 to 1832 and 1841 to 1842 abroad, mainly in England and Italy.

Other work 
Cole is best known for his work as an American landscape artist.  In an 1836 article on "American Scenery", he described his complex relationship with the American landscape in esthetic, emotional, and spiritual terms. He also produced thousands of sketches of varying subject matter.  Over 2,500 of these sketches can be seen at The Detroit Institute of Arts.,

In 1842, Cole embarked on a Grand Tour of Europe in an effort to study in the style of the Old Masters and to paint its scenery.  Most striking to Cole was Europe's tallest active volcano, Mount Etna.  Cole was so moved by the volcano's beauty that he produced several sketches and at least six paintings of it. The most famous of these works is A View of Mount Etna from Taormina which is a  oil on canvas.  Cole also produced a highly detailed sketch View of Mount Etna which shows a panoramic view of the volcano with the crumbling walls of the ancient Greek theater of Taormina on the far right.

Cole was also a poet and dabbled in architecture, a not uncommon practice at the time when the profession was not so codified. Cole was an entrant in the design competition held in 1838 to create the Ohio Statehouse in Columbus, Ohio. His entry won third place, and many contend that the finished building, a composite of the first, second, and third-place entries, bears a great similarity to Cole's entry.

Personal life 
After 1827 Cole maintained a studio at the farm called Cedar Grove, in the town of Catskill, New York.  He painted a significant portion of his work in this studio.  In 1836, he married Maria Bartow of Catskill, a niece of the owners, and became a year-round resident. Thomas and Maria had five children. Cole's daughter Emily was a botanical artist who worked in watercolor and painted porcelain. Cole's sister, Sarah Cole, was also a landscape painter.

Additionally, Cole held many friendships with important figures in the art world including Daniel Wadsworth, with whom he shared a close friendship. Proof of this friendship can be seen in the letters that were unearthed in the 1980s by the Trinity College Watkinson Library. Cole emotionally wrote Wadsworth in July 1832: "Years have passed away since I saw you & time & the world have undoubtedly wrought many changes in both of us; but the recollection of your friendship... [has] never faded in my mind & I look at those pleasures as 'flowers that never will in other garden grow-'"
Thomas Cole died at Catskill on February 11, 1848, of pleurisy. The fourth highest peak in the Catskills is named Thomas Cole Mountain in his honor. Cedar Grove, also known as the Thomas Cole House, was declared a National Historic Site in 1999 and is now open to the public.

Selected works

See also 
 List of paintings by Thomas Cole

References

Other sources

External links 

 Cedar Grove – The Thomas Cole National Historical Site in Catskill, NY
 
 Works by Thomas Cole at the Cincinnati Art Museum
 White Mountain paintings by Thomas Cole
 Reynolda House Museum of American Art
  Information about Thomas Cole can be found in the Thomas Cole Collection, which contains correspondence, financial and legal documents, clippings, exhibition catalogs, poems related to him and his family, in the Albany Institute of History & Art Library.
 Thomas A. Cole Papers, 1821–1863. This finding aid contains biographical information about Cole and describes the collection of his papers (correspondence, journals, notebooks, essays and poetry) held by the New York State Library.
 Thomas Cole's Journal, 1834–1848. The journal, which was digitized by the New York State Library, contains scattered handwritten entries from November 5, 1834, through February 1, 1848.
 Art and the empire city: New York, 1825–1861, an exhibition catalog from The Metropolitan Museum of Art (fully available online as PDF), which contains material on Thomas Cole (see index)
 American paradise: the world of the Hudson River school, an exhibition catalog from The Metropolitan Museum of Art (fully available online as PDF), which contains material on Thomas Cole (see index)
 Hudson River school visions: the landscapes of Sanford R. Gifford, an exhibition catalog from The Metropolitan Museum of Art (fully available online as PDF), which contains paintings by and material on Cole (see index)
 American Scenery, by Thomas Cole Full text with introduction
 

1801 births
1848 deaths
19th-century American painters
American male painters
American landscape painters
British emigrants to the United States
Hudson River School painters
People from Bolton
People from Catskill, New York
19th-century American male artists